Van Benthem is a Dutch surname meaning "from Bentheim". It can refer to:

Evert van Benthem (b. 1958), Dutch speedskater, twice winner of the Elfstedentocht 
Jean Van Benthem (fl. 1908), Belgian cyclist
Johan van Benthem (b. 1949), Dutch professor of logic 
Johannes Bob van Benthem (1921-2006), Dutch lawyer, first president of the European Patent Office
Merle van Benthem (b. 1992), Dutch off-road bicycle racer
Roland van Benthem (b. 1968), Dutch politician

See also
Benthem (disambiguation)

Dutch-language surnames
Surnames of Dutch origin